This is a list of game show hosts. A game show host is a profession involving the hosting of game shows.  Game shows usually range from a half hour to an hour long and involve a prize. 



A

B

C

D

E

F

G

H

I

J

K

L

M

N

O

P

Q

R

S

T

U

V

W

Y

Z

Bibliography
David Schwartz, Steve Ryan & Fred Wostbrock, The Encyclopedia of TV Game Shows – 3rd Edition, Checkmark Books,

References

List
Game show hosts
Game show